Fishhooks Wilderness is a  wilderness area located in the U.S. state of Arizona. It borders the San Carlos Indian Reservation.

Access

Turn left onto Hot Springs Road and travel  along the north side of the Gila River on graded dirt county road. One mile past the wire gate across the road and just before the farm fields, turn northeast onto an unmarked dirt road and proceed straight through the junction. Ten miles from the county road is the Diamond Bar Ranch headquarters. From here, drive north for one mile (1.6 km) where the wilderness borders the road. Another road branches east at the headquarters forming the wilderness boundary after a half mile. Occasional signs mark the wilderness boundary along these two roads.

A recreation permit must be obtained from the San Carlos Apache Indian Reservation before crossing reservation lands.

See also
 List of Arizona Wilderness Areas
 List of U.S. Wilderness Areas

References

External links
 BLM Fishhooks Wilderness Area page
 Wilderness.net Fishhooks Wilderness Area page
 Packyourgear.com Fishhooks Wilderness Area page

Wilderness areas of Arizona
Protected areas of Graham County, Arizona
IUCN Category Ib
Bureau of Land Management areas in Arizona